Mallodon downesi is a species of beetle belonging to the family Cerambycidae.

Description
The  colours range from dark brown to black. Females are larger than males, but males have longer curved mandibles. Antennae are quite short in comparison with other species in the family. These beetles lay their eggs in rotten wood.

Main host plants are Acacia polyacantha, Cananga odorata, Canarium schweinfurthii, Cocos nucifera, Daniellia oliveri, Delonix regia, Hevea brasiliensis, Khaya anthotheca, Persea americana, Spondias mombin, Spondias purpurea, Sterculia tragacantha, Tamarindus indica and Theobroma cacao.

Distribution
This species is widespread throughout the Afrotropical and Madagascan regions (Angola, Benin, Botswana, Burundi, Cameroon, Central African Republic, Comoros, Democratic Republic of the Congo, Ethiopia, Gabon, Gambia, Ghana, Guinea, Guinea-Bissau, Ivory Coast, Kenya, Liberia, Madagascar, Mali, Mozambique, Namibia, Nigeria, Republic of the Congo, Rwanda, São Tomé and Príncipe, Senegal, Sierra Leone, South Africa, Tanzania, Togo, Uganda, Zambia and Zimbabwe).

References
 Biolib
 Global species
 F. Vitali downesi Cerambycoidea
 Hans G. Schabel Forest entomology in East Africa

External links

 Mallodon downesi on Hlasek

Prioninae
Beetles of Africa
Beetles described in 1843